Lennart Gustavsson (born 1954), is a Swedish Left Party politician, member of the Riksdag 1998–2006.

References

1954 births
Date of birth missing (living people)
Living people
Members of the Riksdag 1998–2002
Members of the Riksdag 2002–2006
Members of the Riksdag from the Left Party (Sweden)
Place of birth missing (living people)